The Phricanthini are a tribe of tortrix moths.

Genera
Chersomorpha
Denaeantha
Phricanthes
Scolioplecta

References

 
Moth tribes